Kim Yun-Mi  (born 1 July 1993,) is a North Korean footballer who plays as a midfielder for the North Korea women's national football team. She was part of the team at the 2014 Algarve Cup, 2014 Asian Games and 2015 EAFF Women's East Asian Cup. At the club level, she played for April 25 Sports Club in North Korea.

International goals

National team

References

External links
 

1993 births
Living people
North Korean women's footballers
North Korea women's international footballers
Place of birth missing (living people)
Women's association football midfielders
Footballers at the 2014 Asian Games
Asian Games gold medalists for North Korea
Asian Games medalists in football
Footballers at the 2018 Asian Games
Medalists at the 2014 Asian Games
21st-century North Korean women